Free People is an American bohemian apparel and lifestyle retail company that sells women’s clothing, accessories, shoes, intimates, and swimwear. It also has a beauty and wellness category, which includes products such as cosmetics, skin, and oral care, oral supplements, crystals, and books.

The prices of their items range from $4 to upwards of $2,500. Recently, the company has added a category called “FP Movement,” which is a mix of athletic and athleisure clothing, in addition to information on workout classes and events.

Their headquarters is located in Philadelphia, Pennsylvania, and Free People is a part of Urban Outfitters, Inc., along with Anthropologie, BHLDN, Terrain, and the Vetri family restaurant group. Today, Free People sells their line in 1,400 specialty stores worldwide. The brand is distributed globally via direct channels, including the Free People Global site and Free People UK site, as well as specialty clothing boutiques, department stores, and the brand’s freestanding retail locations in the U.S. and Canada.

History
In the early 1970s, Richard Hayne opened a store in West Philadelphia, Pennsylvania, with his first wife, Judy Wicks, and named it Free People. His store attracted the young people who lived and shopped in the area. When its popularity grew, he opened a second store, and he changed its name from Free People to Urban Outfitters. Urban Outfitters’ business began to grow rapidly. Dick’s then wife, Meg, oversaw the development of Urban Outfitters’ private label division, which supported product exclusive to Urban Outfitters. This proved to be quite successful; by 1984, the wholesale line "Free People" was back in action.

In the fall of 2002, the first Free People Boutique opened in Paramus, New Jersey.  Since the first boutique opened, there are now boutiques all over the United States, Canada and. Free People developed an app which allows users to shop and to upload their own looks and pictures wearing Free People clothing and products.

In 2006, Free People partnered with Ed Mullen Studio to design an e-commerce strategy. According to the studio, Free People is a constantly changing and evolving brand whose goal is to promote creativity, travel, and neat style.

As of 2021, Free People sells in over 1,400 specialty stores worldwide. Some department stores, such as Nordstrom and Bloomingdale's, have created in-store concept shops to enhance the beauty of the clothes, and provide their customers with the quintessential Free People experience.

Along with serving as URBN’s chief creative officer, Margaret Hayne is also currently chief executive of Free People.

In the first six months of 2013, sales topped $180 million, an increase over the $135 million in 2012; the company's use of big data and social commerce were factors in its sales growth.

Boutiques and showrooms 

 Free People has a total of 136 free standing boutiques across the United States and Canada.
 Free People also operates wholesale a pop-up showroom located in the United Kingdom: the only store outside of North America. There are shows every month.
 Free People also sell their clothing to independent boutiques within Canada.

Partnerships 
On May 24, 2016, Free People partnered with Girls Inc. This partnership has developed the brand more. It is a charity-driven social campaign. The campaign supports over 140,000 innovative, confident, strong, and smart girls across the U.S. and Canada to succeed. Free People contributes by sending several women each month that they think best spread Girls Inc. across their social media channels, by giving a donation and sending them Free People apparel. Free People gives away cloth bags. Whenever someone re-uses or does not accept the cloth bag at check out, Free People donates .25 cents to Girls Inc.

Free People also partnered with The Chalkboard Mag for their Worldwide FP Let's Move event tour. In January 2017, Free People announced their third annual event tour.

Free People partnered with WebLinc when creating their multichannel app. The app has been downloaded an estimated 130,000 times.

Controversies
In May 2015, the company was criticized online by professional ballet dancers for using an untrained dancer in an ad. 

In April 2016, the company was criticized for the advertisements of its new clothing line directed towards music festival attendees. The advertisements promoted Native American styled clothing on a Caucasian model, which garnered criticism on social media.

References 

Clothing retailers of the United States
Clothing brands of the United States
Companies based in Philadelphia
Retail companies established in 1984